Hodgepodge or hotchpotch describes a confused or disorderly mass or collection of things; a "mess" or a "jumble".

Hodge-podge may refer to:
 Hodge-Podge (comics), a character from the comic strip Bloom County
 Hodge-Podge (soup), a type of mutton soup

See also 
 Hotchpot, in property law, the blending or combining of property in order to ensure equality of division
 Hodgepodge Lodge, 1970–1977 American children's television series shown on a number of PBS stations
 Hotch Potch House, a BBC television programme aimed at preschool children.
 Hutspot, a simple traditional Dutch casserole, usually composed of potatoes, carrots, and onions, all mashed together.
 Kids' CBC, a programming block on CBC Television called Hodge Podge Lodge from the 1980s to the early 1990s
 Sacred Chao, a symbol used by Discordians to illustrate the interrelatedness of order and disorder
 Lancashire Hotpot, a dish of lamb, potatoes and onions.
 Gallimaufry (book), a book collection of essays by Joseph Epstein